Annelie Holmström (born 10 January 1964) is a breaststroke Swedish swimmer. She competed in two events at the 1984 Summer Olympics.

References

External links
 

1964 births
Living people
Swedish female breaststroke swimmers
Olympic swimmers of Sweden
Swimmers at the 1984 Summer Olympics
Swimmers from Stockholm
20th-century Swedish women